Cerro Navia (Spanish for "Navia Hill") is a commune of Chile located in Santiago Province, Santiago Metropolitan Region. It is one of the most densely populated communes of Santiago, Chile.

History 
Officially established on March 17, 1981, it wasn't until December 1984 that Cerro Navia became its own commune, taking over much of Pudahuel, part of Quinta Normal, and the old commune of Las Barrancas.

Demographics
The population fell by 4.8% (7423 persons) between the 1992 and 2002 censuses. The 2006 projected population was 143,035.

Stats
Average annual household income: US$23,778 (PPP, 2006)
Population below poverty line: 17.5% (2006)
Regional quality of life index: 71.33, mid-low, 40 out of 52 (2005)
Human Development Index: 0.683, 165 out of 341 (2003)

Administration
As a commune, Cerro Navia is a third-level administrative division of Chile administered by a municipal council, headed by an alcalde who is directly elected every four years. The 2016-2020 alcalde is Mauro Tamayo Rozas (IC). The communal council has the following members:
 Magaly Acevedo (RN)
 David Urbina (Ind./MAS)
 Judith Rodríguez (PCCh)
 Rodrigo Valladares (PS)
 René Solano Valdés (UDI)
 Leonardo Suárez (RN)
 Danae Vera (RN)
 Evangelina Cid (PDC)

Within the electoral divisions of Chile, Cerro Navia is represented in the Chamber of Deputies by Nicolás Monckeberg (RN) and Cristina Girardi (PPD) as part of the 18th electoral district, (together with Quinta Normal and Lo Prado). The commune is represented in the Senate by Guido Girardi Lavín (PPD) and Jovino Novoa Vásquez (UDI) as part of the 7th senatorial constituency (Santiago-West).

References

External links 
  Municipality of Cerro Navia

Populated places in Santiago Province, Chile
Geography of Santiago, Chile
Communes of Chile
Populated places established in 1981
1981 establishments in Chile